The 2015 Internacional Femenil Monterrey was a professional tennis tournament played on outdoor hard courts. It was the third edition of the tournament and part of the 2015 ITF Women's Circuit, offering a total of $50,000 in prize money. It took place in Monterrey, Mexico, on 21–27 September 2015.

Singles main draw entrants

Seeds 

 1 Rankings as of 14 September 2015

Other entrants 
The following players received wildcards into the singles main draw:
  Carolina Betancourt
  Giuliana Olmos
  Ana Sofía Sánchez
  Nazari Urbina

The following players received entry from the qualifying draw:
  Kristie Ahn
  Cristiana Ferrando
  Montserrat González
  Nadia Podoroska

The following player received entry by a lucky loser spot:
  Martina Caregaro

Champions

Singles

 Ysaline Bonaventure def.  Montserrat González, 6–1, 6–2

Doubles

 Ysaline Bonaventure /  Elise Mertens def.  Marina Melnikova /  Mandy Minella, 6–4, 3–6, [11–9]

External links 
 2015 Internacional Femenil Monterrey at ITFtennis.com
 Official website 

2015 ITF Women's Circuit
2015
2015
2015 in Mexican tennis
September 2015 sports events in Mexico